Commodore is a one-star rank in the Indian Navy. Commodore ranks above the rank of captain and below the two-star rank of rear admiral.

The equivalent rank in the Indian Army is brigadier and in the Indian Air Force is air commodore.

History
After the Independence of India, Captain Ajitendu Chakraverti was the first Indian to be promoted to the rank of commodore, when he took over as the officiating Chief of Staff at Naval Headquarters.

Appointments
Officers in the rank of commodore hold important appointments like Commodore Commanding Submarines (COMCOS). The command and control of all submarines with the Western and Eastern Naval Commands resides with the COMCOS. The COMCOS (West) and COMCOS (East) report into the FOC-in-C of their respective commands. Officers in the rank of commodore serve as commanding officers of shore establishments like INS Hansa, INS Shivaji, etc. Commodores also fill appointments of naval officer-in-charge (NOIC) of naval areas. The naval attachés and naval advisors at India's high commissions and embassies in select countries are officers of the rank of commodore. At Naval headquarters, commodores hold the appointments of principal directors of directorates and branches.

Insignia
The pennant of a Commodore has a horizontal red stripe and a vertical red stripe intersecting at the centre. On top of the intersection is superimposed a navy-blue Ashoka Chakra with the upper canton next to the staff containing one red roundel. The badge of rank consists of a band of gold lace, with a circle of lace above. A commodore wears gorget patches which are golden patches with one white star. In addition to this, the double-breasted reefer jacket has one broad golden sleeve stripe with a circle above.

Pay scale
Commodores are at pay level 13A, with a monthly pay between ₹139,600 and ₹217,600 with a monthly service pay of ₹15,500.

Famous Indian commodores
 Arogyaswami Paulraj - Electrical engineer and inventor

Rank insignia and personal flag

See also
 Naval ranks and insignia of India

References

Bibliography

India Navy
Indian Navy
Military ranks of the Indian Navy
One-star officers